Meski is a small town in Errachidia Province in the Drâa-Tafilalet region of Morocco.  It has fewer than 1,000 inhabitants. 

It was the location of a battle between French and Berber forces in the Zaian War on 15 January 1919 where General Joseph-François Poeymirau defeated Sidi Mhand n'Ifrutant.

References 

Populated places in Errachidia Province